Nancy Kerr (born April 2, 1947, in Moose Jaw, Saskatchewan) is a Canadian curler.

In 2000, she was inducted into Canadian Curling Hall of Fame together with all of the 1980 Marj Mitchell team.

On the March 21, 1981 she was installed to Saskatchewan Sports Hall of Fame with all of the 1980 Marj Mitchell team.

Teams

References

External links
 

Living people
1947 births
Sportspeople from Moose Jaw
Curlers from Regina, Saskatchewan
Canadian women curlers
World curling champions
Canadian women's curling champions